Ravid Plotnik (born 13 January 1988), also known by his stage name Nechi Nech (from Amharic ነጭ, white) is an Israeli singer and rapper.

Early life
Ravid Plotnik was born in Petah Tikva, Israel, to a family of Ashkenazi Jewish descent. His parents are Uzi, a businessman, and Tali, a housewife. His older sister is named Shira. When he was 6, his family moved to Sha'arei Tikva. When he was 12 his mother died of cancer and two years later his family returned to reside in his hometown of Petah Tikva. At 13, he became interested in African-American music under the influence of his older sister, a singer as well.

Plotnik was inspired by his childhood hero Israeli rapper Subliminal. His stage name is derived from the Amharic word "Nech". Most of Plotnik's childhood friends in Israel were Ethiopian Jews, calling him so affectionately.

Career
When Plotnik was 15 he founded the band "Produx" with his friends Shmuel "Aritso" Yosef and Shimson "Chichu" Adama.

In August 2006 Plotnik joined the IDF, where he served as a quartermaster clerk for the Israeli Intelligence Directorate. In February 2010, three months after he discharged from the IDF, Produx's first album "Thia'at Ha'Metim" was released. Later that year the band broke up due to disagreements between the members.

In August 2011 Plotnik released his first solo album "Tsadik Ehad Be'Sdom", .

In May 2013 he released his second album: "Bor Ve'Am Ha'Haretz: Sipuro Shel HaBoom-Shaka-Lak", which he toured around Israel with stops in Tel Aviv, Haifa, Jerusalem, Mitzpe Ramon, Ashdod, Rehovot, Rishon LeZion and more. This album placed him in the Israeli Hip Hop charts.

In 2014, Plotnik featured in the hit "Yehe BeSeder" by Strong Black Coffee, 
for which Plotnik wrote and sang the chorus.
July 1, 2015 saw the release of his third album "Bruchim Ha'Ba'im LePetah Tikva" which deals largely with his childhood and youth in Petah Tikva. 
In March 2016 Plotnik won an Acum prize for best up-and-coming artist.

In May 2016, he released his single "Ani Kan Lishbor", and was featured on "Olam Meshoga" by the rapper Tuna.

In 2017 he released the first single "Kol HaZman Haze" from the album "Shefel Ve'Geut", composed in collaboration with Dudu Tassa. The track won first place in the Galgalatz Yearly Playlist and the album was chosen for an Acum prize in the category album of the year.

In May 2019, Plotnik released his album Ve'Achshav La'Helek Ha'Omanuti, which is the first not under his stage name.

Personal life
Plotnik resided in Kfar Sirkin, Israel, with his father for years.
In 2019 Plotnik moved to Ein Ganim.

Discography
2010: Thiyat Ha'Metim (With Produx)
2011: Tsadik Ehad Be'Sdom
2013: Bur Ve'Am Ha'Aretz
2015: Bruchim Ha'Ba'im LePetah Tikva
2017: Shefel Ve'Geut
2019: Ve'Achshav La'Helek Ha'Omanuti

References

1988 births
Israeli Jews
Israeli rappers
Jewish rappers
Living people
People from Petah Tikva
Israeli male singer-songwriters
Jewish composers
Jewish songwriters
21st-century Israeli  male singers
Israeli poets